"Sinner Man" or "Sinnerman" is an African American traditional spiritual song that has been recorded by a number of performers and has been incorporated in many other media and arts. The lyrics describe a sinner attempting to hide from divine justice on Judgment Day. It was recorded in the 1950s by Les Baxter, the Swan Silvertones, the Weavers and others, before Nina Simone recorded an extended version in 1965.

1950s recordings
The earliest recording of the song to bear the title "Sinner Man" was by the Les Baxter Orchestra in 1956, as the B-side of the Capitol Records single "Tango of the Drums".  The lead vocal was by folk singer Will Holt, who shared the credit for writing the song with Baxter.  However, the song clearly bears a close resemblance, in both melody and lyrics, to "On the Judgement Day", which was recorded by gospel group The Sensational Nightingales in 1954 and released the following year on the Peacock label. The writing of The Sensational Nightingales' song was credited to two of the group's singers, Julius Cheeks and Ernest James. Some of the lyrics in "Sinner Man", including "The rock cried out, 'No hiding place'", appear to derive from those in the spiritual, "No Hiding Place Down Here", recorded in 1928 by the Old South Quartette.

A version of "Sinner Man" released in 1956, by Swedish-American folk singer William Clauson, credited Baxter, Holt, Cheeks and James as co-writers.   Another gospel group, the Swan Silvertones, released their version of the song in 1957 on the Vee-Jay label, and folk singer Guy Carawan issued a version in 1958.  Carawan wrote that he had learned the song in 1956 from Bob Gibson. Pete Seeger also refers to Bob Gibson as the one who 'taught us' the song, during his Live concert at Mandel Hall, Chicago, in 1957.  Most modern recorded versions derive from the 1956 recording by Les Baxter. Further changes and additions were codified in 1959 by the folk music group the Weavers. The Weavers' performance of the song appears on their compilation albums Gospel and Reunion at Carnegie Hall Part 2.

Nina Simone recording

"Sinnerman" (spelled as one word) is one of Nina Simone's most famous songs.  She recorded her definitive 10-minute-plus version on her 1965 album Pastel Blues, on which the credit is simply given as "Arranged by Nina Simone". Simone learned the lyrics of the song in her childhood when it was used at revival meetings by her mother, a Methodist minister, to help people confess their sins. In the early days of her career during the early sixties, when she was heavily involved in the Greenwich Village scene, Simone often used the long piece to end her live performances. An earlier version of the song exists, recorded live at The Village Gate, but was not used on the 1962 Colpix album Nina at the Village Gate. It was added as a bonus track to the 2005 CD release.

Simone's version of "Sinnerman" has been sampled by Kanye West for the Talib Kweli song "Get By" (2003), by Timbaland for the song "Oh Timbaland" (2007), and by Felix da Housecat for Verve Record's "Verve Remixed" series (Verve Remixed 2 (2003), Verve Remixed Plus (2005)). French rapper Abd al-Malik sampled Simone's version for the title track of his 2006 album Gibraltar. The 2018 Hozier track "Nina Cried Power" and the 2020 Celeste track "Stop This Flame" also sample the song.

Nina Simone's version was used as a soundtrack to the art gallery theft scene in the 1999 film The Thomas Crown Affair. Her version is also played during the end credits of David Lynch's 2006 experimental film Inland Empire, and was featured in the video game Marc Ecko's Getting Up.

Peter Tosh and the Wailers versions

"Sinner Man" has also been recorded as ska and reggae versions several times by the Wailers.

It was first recorded by the group at Studio One in Kingston, Jamaica in early 1966; Peter Tosh and Bunny Wailer shared lead vocals.

A different version entitled "Downpressor" was recorded by Peter Tosh & The Wailers in 1970 ("downpressor" meaning "oppressor" in Rastafarian vocabulary).  The song featured Tosh on lead vocals and Bunny Wailer on background. An instrumental version was also released.  Songwriting credit for this version is sometimes given to Peter Tosh.

Another version was recorded in 1971 as "Oppressor Man". This version was billed as a Peter Tosh solo single, and the B Side of the single featured an instrumental version. It was one of the rarer songs from the period before being included, along with its version, on JAD's Black Dignity compilation in 2004.

Tosh recorded the song again as "Downpresser Man" for his 1977 solo album Equal Rights and released a live recording of the song in a medley with "Equal Rights" on his 1983 album Captured Live.

Other versions

The band His Name Is Alive released a version of the song on their 1997 EP Nice Day (as "Oh Sinner Man").

The song has also been covered by 16 Horsepower on their album Folklore (2002); by Irish singer Sinéad O'Connor on her 2005 album Throw Down Your Arms; and by the ska-punk band Goldfinger.

In 2020, Vika and Linda covered the song for their album, Sunday (The Gospel According to Iso).

In 2021, Sofi Tukker released a remix of Sinnerman.

On the Netflix show, Lucifer, Lucifer (played by Tom Ellis) plays the piano and sings the song for the crowd at his nightclub in the sixth episode of the first season.

In the HBO show, Lovecraft Country, a cover by Alice Smith of "Sinnerman" is played over the closing credits for each episode.

In the HBO show The Righteous Gemstones, a cover of "Sinnerman" by The Travelers Three (1962) is played over the closing credits of season 2 episode 3.

References

External links 
"Sinnerman" information including lyrics at the Nina Simone Database.   — meaning, given to online learning guide
"Sinner Man" page at The 60's Jamaican Music Reference

American folk songs
Peter, Paul and Mary songs
Nina Simone songs
Trini Lopez songs
Peter Tosh songs
Three Dog Night songs